Navia subpetiolata is a plant species in the genus Navia. This species is endemic to Venezuela.

References

subpetiolata
Flora of Venezuela